Xynomizithra or xynomyzithra is a Greek whey cheese with some added milk; it is a sour variant of Mizithra, and made from ewes' and/or goats' milk.  The proportion of full-cream milk is about 15%.

It is mainly produced on the island of Crete but other areas in Greece also produce it.  Xynomyzithra Kritis (xynomizithra of Crete) is a European protected designation of origin.

Production

Xynomizithra is made from strained ewe and/or goat whey which is heated and stirred.  A small amount of full-cream milk (up to 15% for Xynomyzithra Kritis) is then added. The resulting curd stands for 30 minutes and is then put into molds to drain.  It is then pressed and ripened for not less than 2 months.

Serving
It comes in various sizes and its shape is usually truncated cone or ball. The cheese is soft, snow-white, creamy, and moist, with a sour taste.

It is commonly served with honey as a dessert. It is also used as a table cheese, in salads, and in baked goods, notably in small cheese pies ("kalitsounia").

See also
List of cheeses
Cuisine of Greece

Notes

Greek cheeses
Sheep's-milk cheeses
Goat's-milk cheeses
Whey cheeses
Greek products with protected designation of origin
Cheeses with designation of origin protected in the European Union